The Proton Iriz, codenamed P2-30A is a five-door, five-seater supermini from the Malaysian automobile manufacturer, Proton. It was unveiled on 25 September 2014 at Proton City by former Malaysian Prime Minister, Mahathir Mohamad. The Iriz is the successor to the Proton Savvy.

Etymology 

The name Iriz is inspired from the anatomical term iris, responsible for sight and vision.

Pre-launch 

Plans for a Proton Savvy replacement were first revealed with the introduction of the Proton EMAS concept cars at the 2010 Geneva Motor Show. The EMAS concept cars were designed by Italdesign Giugiaro and are related to the Lotus Ethos, a similar concept car from Proton's British subsidiary. Proton and Lotus Cars wished to jointly develop the global small car, where the Proton versions will be aimed at the budget conscious and the Lotus models on the equally alluring hot hatch market. However, since the announcement, Proton has undergone a change in ownership and further details on the joint venture have not been publicized. Proton also considered a tie-up with Mitsubishi Motors in 2011 regarding the development of Proton's upcoming small car. With Italdesign Giugiaro being bought by Volkswagen Group in August 2010, the EMAS soon evolved in the form of Volkswagen Up! which also spun off into two other VW subsidiary models, the Skoda Citigo and the Seat Mii.

The first spy shot of a testing mule unit was uploaded online in March 2013. It revealed a heavily masked and widened Proton Savvy. The same testing unit was sighted in June 2013 on the Kesas Highway.

The first official Iriz details from Proton came in the form of a naming contest called Nama Siapa Hebat? ("Whose Name Is Greatest?" in English). The contest invited all citizens of Malaysia to help name the upcoming car. The name had to be in Malay and was to consist of no more than six letters. The contest ran for one month from 25 June till 25 July 2013. The grand prize winner was to receive a Premium variant of the car upon its launch in 2014. Proton began processing contest entries by August 2013, taking the necessary precautions to avoid trademark conflicts and language ambiguity in global markets.

On 26 November 2013, the first spy shots of a heavily masked production-ready Iriz went viral. The car was reportedly undergoing testing for its electronic stability control (ESC) unit in an automotive testing facility in Europe. The images confirmed that the car was a 5-door hatchback, unlike the 3-door Proton EMAS concept. On 10 December 2013, two heavily masked Iriz testing units were sighted on a highway in Malaysia. Both cars were escorted by an undisguised Honda Brio, a car which is not sold in the Malaysian market. Several more Iriz testing units were since spotted at various locations across Peninsular Malaysia in December, all of which were heavily masked. On New Year's Day, clearer spy shots revealed a more aggressively-styled grille and built-in LED Daytime Running Lights (DRL). On 8 January 2014, an Iriz testing unit with partially exposed tail lights was spotted in Belgium. The following week, another prototype was seen on a trailer, bound for cold climate testing in a snowy part of Europe. The same unit was spotted again on 29 January in northern Sweden, close to the Arctic Circle. It was reportedly being tested with a Continental ESC unit. On 4 February, an Iriz testing unit with a rear spoiler was spotted in Malaysia.

The clearest spy shots of the Iriz interior were snapped on 10 February 2014. The photos confirmed that the P2-30A comes equipped with ESC and a continuously variable transmission (CVT). A large 2-DIN touchscreen infotainment system is also pictured, along with the controls for the air-conditioning which include a heating system, front parking sensors and leather seats. Three days later, additional spy shots of a separate Iriz test unit revealed a different, non-touchscreen infotainment system. On 7 March, a spy video of the car undergoing cold climate testing was uploaded online.

On 23 May 2014, a large convoy of Proton Iriz alongside several other non-Proton cars were spotted in Kota Bharu, Malaysia. The spy shots alluded that the Proton GSC is being benchmarked against the Perodua Myvi, Honda Brio, Ford Fiesta and Volkswagen Polo TSI hatchbacks. The photos also revealed a subtle body kit on one of the Iriz units. The same convoy was spotted three days later in Cameron Highlands, adding further credibility to initial speculations that the Proton GSC is indeed being benchmarked against the aforementioned models.

On 16 June 2014, two high-quality photos of a fully exposed, near production-ready Proton Iriz were leaked online. The photos, the most revealing thus far were reportedly taken during the Iriz ASEAN NCAP crash test assessment at a Malaysian Institute of Road Safety (MIROS) facility.

On 25 June 2014, a convoy of masked Proton Iriz units were photographed on a busy street in Bukit Bintang, Kuala Lumpur. One of the two photos clearly show that the Proton Iriz is as large or larger than the first-generation Perodua Myvi. On the 4th of July, a spy shot of a masked Iriz testing unit in the 'Atlantic Blue' paint colour option from the Proton Suprima S was uploaded online. The same unit was seen again on 21 July near Kuala Lumpur International Airport.

The first official teaser of the Iriz was included as part of Proton's 2014 Hari Raya television advertisement which was first aired on 23 July 2014. A single image of the Iriz's front headlamp housing was shown at the end of the video, with the caption Nantikan Kemunculannya ("Wait For Its Appearance" in English). The photo confirms that the Iriz will be offered with projector headlamps in a chromed housing. The word 'PROTON' is also finely embossed in the headlamp housing.

On 11 August 2014, a summarised specifications sheet for the Proton Iriz was leaked online. while on 22 August 2014, Proton Chief Technical Officer (CTO) Abdul Rashid Musa held a media briefing on the upcoming P2-30A. The briefing detailed that two new engines will be offered, a 1.3 litre and a 1.6 litre, both of which incorporate variable valve timing (VVT) technology for more power and improved fuel-efficiency. The new Proton will be able to travel from Bukit Kayu Hitam in the very north of the Malay Peninsula to Johor Bahru in the very south, a journey of around 800 kilometres (500 miles) in just a single tank of petrol. It is however worth noting that Proton's older CamPro CPS and more recent CamPro CFE also offer VVT technology. The new 1.3 and 1.6 engines will also offer reduced emissions, in line with Proton's intentions to sell the P2-30A in markets which impose taxes based on emissions such as the European Union. The car will also be offered with an electric power steering (EPS) system for ease of steering and improved fuel efficiency, along with a choice of either manual or automatic transmission. Proton claims that the new engines will be 10% more fuel-efficient in comparison to the older CamPro engines. Additionally, Azlan Othman, Proton's Head of Styling mentioned that the new GSC will maintain Proton's design philosophy of 'timeless beauty'. In his words, “We don't need to be trendy, and then forgotten. We need to be timeless, to have designs that last.” In terms of safety, the Proton GSC will launch as the safest Proton car yet, safer even than the bigger and more expensive Prevé and Suprima S. It will be equipped with no less than 10 computerised electronic systems, 6 airbags and Proton's Reinforced Safety Structure (RESS) with Hot Press Forming (HPF) technology. The P2-30A will be offered in at least 3 variants, namely 'Standard', 'Executive' and 'Premium', in a range of seven different colours. Proton also iterated that the GSC is not a direct successor or replacement to the Savvy as initially believed by the media, but is instead a separate new segment for Proton. The GSC will be a larger B-segment 5-door hatchback, unlike the much smaller A-segment Savvy.

On 23 August 2014, a photo of a near production-ready Proton Iriz was leaked online. Apart from the masked badge and partially covered headlamps, the car is completely undisguised, and sports a new bright green paint colour. A second silver coloured Proton Iriz is also partially visible in the background, identical to the green unit but without the Daytime Running Light (DRL) housing. On 14 September 2014, Mahathir Mohamed, then the Chairman of Proton, pulled a publicity stunt by driving an undisguised Proton Iriz to a restaurant in Kuala Lumpur.

The Proton Iriz, which is a larger B-segment hatchback will not compete with the Perodua Axia, a similar but smaller A-segment car, which is launched in the second half of 2014. The Proton Iriz will compete directly with the Perodua Myvi instead. The Myvi has been the best-selling car in Malaysia for 8 consecutive years, between 2006 and 2013 respectively. Furthermore, the Proton Iriz will not compete with Indonesia's Low Cost Green Cars (LCGC), which include the Toyota Agya, Daihatsu Ayla, Suzuki Wagon R, Honda Brio Satya and Datsun Go among others. The Proton GSC will instead compete with the more mainstream B-segment hatchbacks such as the Toyota Yaris, Mitsubishi Mirage, Kia Rio, Honda Jazz and Hyundai i20 in its export markets, but it will nonetheless be priced significantly cheaper than its Japanese and South Korean rivals.

The Proton Iriz Car was originally scheduled for an April, May or June 2014 launch in Malaysia. However, the launch has since been delayed to 25 September. since it has to go a 100,000 km drive cycle on road testing. The Iriz will be the first all-new model to be developed under Proton's new owner, DRB-HICOM. Dr. Mahathir Mohamad, recently appointed chairman of Proton has stated that in a bid to move upmarket, the upcoming Iriz will cost more than expected, but nonetheless still cheaper than its rivals from the same segment. The P2-30A will incorporate better quality components and a long list of standard features never before seen in a small Proton, more even than its bigger siblings, the 2012 Prevé and 2013 Suprima S. Dr. Mahathir has also promised to tackle the issue of quality control among Proton's vendors, with the aim of incorporating the highest quality components from only the best vendors in an effort to improve public confidence in Proton's below-average build quality standards. The Proton Iriz took 4 years to develop at a cost of between RM560 million. The company has also promised a 5-Star ANCAP safety rating for the P2-30A.

Post-launch 

In 2017, Proton Iriz was updated that included various improvement from its sibling, the Persona. The 1.6L Executive variant was released to the public, and the manual transmission was only available on the base Standard model.

From September 2018 onwards, spy shots revealed that Proton was working on a facelift for the Proton Iriz  and in February 2019, Proton released a press release attached with official images showcasing the Proton Iriz facelift. On 28 February 2019, more specifications were revealed on the facelift Iriz during an official media preview. It was revealed that the 1.6L Executive CVT model would make a comeback while the manual transmission will only continued to be offered on the 1.3L Standard model. Also making a comeback is automatic headlights.

On April 23, 2019, Proton officially launched the first facelifted Iriz at the Kuala Lumpur Convention Centre. 

On February 18, 2021, Proton released Proton Iriz R3 limited edition. 

On August 5, 2021, Proton launched the second facelifted Iriz, with three new variants available. The 1.3L Standard, 1.6L Executive and 1.6L Active. Both 1.3L Standard MT and 1.6L Premium variants have been dropped. New colours include Citric Orange and Passion Red, the latter replacing the previous Ruby Red. 

The 2019 Iriz sees a new seat pattern for the Standard and Executive variants, and the air conditioning controls markings are now white only. The Standard variants features a double din like-sized head unit with capacitive buttons that are not visible without illumination. This is a similar head unit to that found in Saga, Persona and Exora Standard. The Executive and Premium variant meanwhile has a head unit that runs GKUI with the Premium variant getting Proton's Hi Proton voice recognition feature. A new gear shifter design are only to be found on the Standard MT and Premium CVT variants with a frameless rear view mirror exclusive to the Premium variant. Lastly there are two types of instrument clusters: one for the Standard with a standard LCD display and one for the Executive and Premium variants with full colour and more functionality.

The 2019 Iriz key design changes include revised front fascia with Proton's new infinite weave design language with a chrome strip dubbed ethereal bow and Proton lettering on the rear as well as redesigned front and rear bumpers. For the Executive and Premium variant, in place of the front fog lamps are now LED DRL's. Two new wheel designs are present. A 14-inch single-tone one for 1.3 Standard variant and 15-inch dual-tone wheels for Executive and Premium variants. Five colours are on offer: Jet Grey, Snow White, Ruby Red, Ocean Blue and Armour Silver.

On 5 August 2021, Proton launched its second facelift of the Proton Irizwhich brought about more changes to its exterior and interior. Gaining an all-new face that's shared with the 2022 Proton Persona for the first time. This includes new bumpers with the top-spec Active variant gaining a rugged crossover look, aimed towards the younger crowd. New 16-inch alloys finish off the exterior, while the interior gains a new look and feel. The dashboard and centre console are new with red highlights found throughout.

Specification 

The Iriz measures 3,905mm (12ft, 8in) in length versus the Myvi's 3,690mm (12ft, 1in); it is also wider at 1,720mm (5ft, 7in) (Myvi: 1,665mm (5ft, 5.6in)), and is 5mm (0.2in) higher than the Myvi (1,550mm (5ft, 1in) for Iriz versus 1,545mm for Myvi). The Iriz has a longer wheelbase of 2,555mm (8ft, 4.6in) versus the Myvi at 2,440mm. The 1.3 litre Iriz is rated at 70 kW (95 PS) at 5,750 rpm, and 120 Nm of torque at 4,000 rpm, while the Myvi 1.3 litre equivalent has lower power (67 kW at 6,000 rpm and 117 Nm torque at 4,400 rpm). Proton uses a 1.6 litre engine pulling 109PS at 5,750 rpm and 150 Nm (111 ft lbs) of torque, which is also higher than the Myvi 1.5 litre engine which pulls 104PS at 6,000 rpm and 136 Nm (100 ft lbs) of torque at 4,000 rpm.

The Proton Iriz is powered by either a 1.3-litre or 1.6-litre four-cylinder engine. Both units are capable of variable valve timing (VVT) and have new blocks, pistons and valves. The new VVT engines are also Euro 5 compliant, but were nonetheless detuned to Euro 4 standards for the domestic market. Proton has announced plans to license a turbo diesel engine from a foreign manufacturer, to better compete in European markets.

Safety 

 ASEAN NCAP - 

All Iriz variants get Proton's VDC (Vehicle Dynamic Control) active safety net which consists of ESC, TCS, ABS, EBD, BA and HHA. Vehicle Dynamic Control aims to prevent or minimize the risks of a potential accident. It monitors the driver's steering and braking input, and if a loss of traction is detected, VDC automatically reduces engine speed and applies braking pressure, ensuring that the driver remains in control. As for safety, the Iriz was tested again in 2020 and scored a maximum of five stars in the ASEAN NCAP crash test. This is done under the newly revised and restructured protocols of the 2020 ASEAN NCAP guidelines which has a different testing regime over its previous system.

The critical sections of the Iriz's body structure incorporates Proton's RESS hot press forming (HPF) technology, which is five times stronger than normal cold rolled galvanized steel. Proton is one of the earliest adopters of HPF technology, and the company's efforts helped rank Malaysia as the sixth country in the world to adopt HPF manufacturing. In the event of an accident, the Iriz's body control module automatically unlocks all doors to facilitate an emergency exit. The Head Restraint reduces the risk of whiplash by preventing the driver's head from tilting backwards during a rear-end collision. All five seats come with 3-point seat belts, and ISOFIX anchors are also fitted in anticipation of the Iriz's launch in more safety-conscious markets.

Reception

Awards and accolades 

 Compact Hatchback - NST-Maybank Car of the Year Awards 2014
 People's Choice - NST-Maybank Car of the Year Awards 2014
 Malaysia Good Design Mark Award 2014
 Best Industrial Design 2015 - the Intellectual Property Corporation
 Most Affordable 5-Star Asean NCAP Car in Malaysia - Asean NCAP Grand Prix Award 2016
 Budget Car of the Year - 2016 ASEAN Car of the Year
Best Compact Hatch - Carsifu Editor's Choice Award 2017
Best NVH (Noise, Vibration and Harshness) - Malaysia Car of the Year (COTY) Awards 2017
Best 3 Compact Hatch of Malaysia‍‍‍ - Aurizn Awards 2018 'Cars of Malaysia'
 Best 3 City Cars - 2019 'Cars of Malaysia'
Best Compact Hatch (below RM70K) - CarSifu Editors' Choice Awards 2019

Notes

References

External links 

 Proton Holdings Berhad

2010s cars
Cars introduced in 2014
Subcompact cars
Hatchbacks
Front-wheel-drive vehicles
Vehicles with CVT transmission
Proton vehicles
ASEAN NCAP superminis